Gerald Pease is a former Democratic Party member of the Montana Senate, who represented District 21 from 2001 to 2009. Earlier he was a member of the Montana House of Representatives from 1997 through 1998.

External links
Montana Senate - Gerald Pease official MT State Legislature website
Project Vote Smart - Senator Gerald Pease (MT) profile
Follow the Money - Gerald Pease
2006 2004 2000 1996 campaign contributions

Democratic Party Montana state senators
Democratic Party members of the Montana House of Representatives
1954 births
Living people
People from Hardin, Montana
People from Lodge Grass, Montana